Colleen Smith Clinkenbeard (born April 13, 1980) is an American voice actress, ADR director, line producer, and writer working for the anime-dubbing company Funimation. One of her major starts was as the English voice provider for Rachel Moore in the long-running detective series Case Closed. She then later served as the Co-ADR director on Fullmetal Alchemist, which aired on Adult Swim in 2004. She has since starred in many popular anime dubs, including as Monkey D. Luffy in One Piece, Erza Scarlet in Fairy Tail, and Momo Yaoyorozu in My Hero Academia.

Career
As a stage actress in Dallas, Clinkenbeard got involved in voice-over when fellow voice actress Laura Bailey brought her to Funimation for an audition. Her first voice role was in Dragon Ball GT; her first lead role was Éclair in Kiddy Grade. Midway through the Kiddy Grade series, director Justin Cook appointed Clinkenbeard as the ADR director for the rest of the episodes. Her other major role early in her career was Rachel Moore in the detective anime show Case Closed. She would later direct along with Mike McFarland on Fullmetal Alchemist which came out in November 2004 on Cartoon Network's Adult Swim programming block.

Clinkenbeard went on to provide the voices of Monkey D. Luffy in One Piece, Erza Scarlet in Fairy Tail, Riza Hawkeye in Fullmetal Alchemist, Moka Akashiya's inner personality in Rosario + Vampire, Yuko Ichihara in xxxHolic, and Elsie Crimson and Mother in Edens Zero.

Outside of anime dubs, she's also provided the voice of Lilith in the Borderlands video game series. Also lending her voice for the anime inspired web series RWBY and providing voice work for Mao Mao: Heroes of Pure Heart on Cartoon Network.

Personal life
Clinkenbeard and voice actress Laura Bailey were roommates while working at Funimation. She married Patric Carroll in 2012, and they have a son named Rhodes, born in 2014. Her sister Bonnie is an ADR script writer at Funimation.

Filmography

Anime

Animation

Films

Video games

References

External links

 
 
 
 Colleen Clinkenbeard profile at the CrystalAcids Anime Voice Actor Database

1980 births
Living people
Actresses from Texas
American film actresses
American stage actresses
American television actresses
American video game actresses
American voice actresses
American women screenwriters
Screenwriters from Texas
American voice directors
Funimation
21st-century American actresses
21st-century American screenwriters
21st-century American women writers